The Original Celtics were a barnstorming professional American basketball team. At various times in their existence, the team played in the American Basketball League, the Eastern Basketball League and the Metropolitan Basketball League. The team has no relation to the NBA Boston Celtics, other than as an indirect inspiration. The franchise as a whole was inducted into the Naismith Memorial Basketball Hall of Fame in 1959.

Early years
The team's roots lay in the New York Celtics team that disbanded during World War I.  In 1918, James Furey assembled his own team around a nucleus of those truly "original" Celtics, adding other players mostly from the West Side of New York City, and defiantly called his new squad the Original Celtics. Initially they played in various struggling professional leagues, before becoming primarily a touring squad which traveled up to 150,000 miles a year while completing a 150–200 game schedule. They won about ninety percent of their games and finished 1922–23 with the unbelievable record of 193–11–1. Hoping to claim an undisputed national championship, they challenged the nationally famous Franklin Wonder Five, but the Franklin coach refused as his team "was too tired" after a grueling year.

The team's first dominant player was "Dutch" Dehnert, a 6'1" (1.85 m) standing guard who some credit with introducing the modern concept of pivot play. When ballhandling wizard Nat Holman (later to coach national championship teams at CCNY) was signed to play for then-coach John Whitty in 1922, the Original Celtics hit their stride.

During the 1921/22 season, the team replaced the New York Giants, whose owner also owned the Whirlwinds during the 1st half. During the 1922/23 season, the team took over the Atlantic City franchise when it was 4–7 and won five of six games before the Eastern League folded in January, 1923. They also competed in the Metropolitan League but dropped out of the league during the 1st half after going 12–0.
Other outstanding individual players on these squads were another "big man", Joe Lapchick; John Beckman, called the "Babe Ruth of Basketball"; George "Horse" Haggerty; John "Pete" Barry; and speedy Davey Banks.

1925–1930: ABL success
American Basketball League owners meeting during the summer of 1926 were generally pleased by the results of the league's inaugural session. Only Buffalo had not signed up for the second season. League President Joe Carr had signed three new members in Baltimore, New York, and Philadelphia. The latter two were of particular importance to the league's credibility. Two Philadelphia boxing promoters, Jules Aronson and Max Hoff were recruited by Carr to finance the team and Eddie Gottlieb was hired to run the team. The situation in New York was considerably less clear. The Original Celtics signed to represent New York, but they were reluctant recruits at best. After last season, Carr had banned any ABL team from playing games against the Celtics, drying up some of their most lucrative exhibition dates. In the past, such a tactic would not have intimidated the Celtics, but they were already under financial stress due to the June indictment of owner Jim Furry for embezzling $190,000 from a New York business.

Then, in early October, just a month before the ABL season was to get underway, the Celtics bolted to the newly organized National Basketball League. The new league operated solely in and around the metropolitan New York City, but despite its geographical limitations was stocked with some of the best players in the country.  After pulling off a coup by signing the Original Celtics, the NBL brashly raided ABL rosters for additional players.

The Brooklyn Arcadians were particularly hard hit, losing stars Red Conaty and Rody Cooney, while Washington lost starters Teddy Kearns and Bob Grody. Washington owner George Preston Marshall completed the destruction of the Arcadians by luring Elmer Ripley and Tillie Voss away from the Brooklyn club to fill the gaps in his lineup left by the National League raids. The newcomers joined Rusty Saunders, Ray Kennedy and George Glasco to restore Marshall’s Palace Five club to its place among the ABL pre-season favorites. Cleveland returned with championship squad intact and further strengthened by the addition of Ohio State rookie Cookie Cunningham and valuable swingman Gil Ely.  With Brooklyn out of the picture, Gottlieb’s new Philadelphia entry became the third contender. The Quakers (later known as the Warriors) showcased a Who’s Who of former Eastern League stars including George Artus, Tom Barlow, Stretch Meehan, Soup Campbell, and Chickie Passon.

Three weeks into the new season, the favorites were all performing up to expectations, but the league had serious problems at the other end of the standings. Brooklyn, Detroit and Baltimore were all winless and showing few signs of improvement. President Carr acted quickly and ruthlessly to solve the dilemma. First, he moved to destroy the foundation of the upstart National League, by secretly negotiating with the Celtics to jump to the ABL. As anticipated, the Celtics' departure triggered an immediate collapse of the rival league. Next, Carr expelled the Detroit and Brooklyn clubs from the ABL, and then awarded the latter franchise to the incoming Celtics. Finally, he bolstered the Baltimore franchise with players from the suddenly defunct NBL.  In a single stroke, Carr had signed basketball’s most famous team, thwarted the upstart NBL, and provided his league with an additional pool of dozens of top players.

The Original Celtics quickly waded into the race for first-half honors of the ABL, winning 13 of 16 games, but the 0–5 record they were forced to inherit from the Arcadians was impossible to overcome. Cleveland captured first place by one game over Washington with Philadelphia in third and the Celtics in fourth place. Starting with a fresh slate, the Celtics quickly took charge of the second half of the season with nine straight victories. Fort Wayne, which had been a major beneficiary at mid-season of National League players, finished second.  The most important addition to the Indiana club was Benny Borgmann, who quickly established him as the league’s premier offensive star. Washington and Philadelphia followed in third and fourth place, while first-half winner Cleveland slumped badly to fifth place. Cleveland's fall was precipitated by the hasty mid-season departure of star Honey Russell, who was exiled to Chicago after a disagreement with team owner Max Rosenblum. The Celtics easily disposed of the weakened Cleveland team in three straight games to take the ABL championship.

In 1926, the American Basketball League, developed by sports entrepreneur George Preston Marshall, effectively railroaded the team into joining its ranks by prohibiting member teams from playing against them. The Original Celtics responded by winning the next two ABL titles. During their first full season in the ABL, their dominance was so absolute that fans in other cities took up the cry, "Break up the Celtics!" In response, the league disbanded the Celtics and apportioned their players to the other teams. The strategy backfired as game attendance plummeted and, further deflated by the Great Depression, the ABL folded after the 1931 season.

During the 1926–27 season, the team replaced the Brooklyn Arcadians after five games and took the name Brooklyn Celtics. By the next season, they had returned to the name, New York Celtics. After winning back-to-back ABL championships in 1926–27 and 1927–28, the team was broken up. An attempt to return the team for the 1929–30 season failed, and the team dropped out of the league during the first half on December 10, 1929. Later the team, sponsored by popular singer Kate Smith, also played in the ABL in the 1936–37 and 1937–38 as New York Celtics and in 1938–39 as Kingston Colonials; in this last year with the ABL, they won the regular season but lost in playoffs.

Mid-1930s: Travelling team
The Original Celtics briefly reorganized as a barnstorming team in the 1930s, but never replicated their initial glory.

Year-by-year

Notable players
Notable players with the Original Celtics include:
John Beckman (1895–1968)
Dutch Dehnert (1898–1979)
John "Pete" Barry (1897–1968)
Joe Lapchick (1900–1970)
Nat Holman (1896–1995)
Elmer Ripley (1891-1982)
Lou Bender (1910–2009), pioneer player with the Columbia Lions and in early pro basketball, who was later a successful trial attorney.

Ash Resnick (1916-1989), mob figure

Trophies
 American Basketball League: 2 (1927, 1928)

References

External links 
Original Celtics at the Basketball Hall of Fame.
Fox, Larry. 1973. Illustrated History of Basketball.
 
 
 

 
Celtics